Ivanuš Pergošić (1521-1592) was early Kajkavian author from Habsburg Slavonia and author of the 1574 translation of Tripartitum (written by István Werbőczy) which is the first printed Kajkavian book.

In 1564 Pergošić was a rector of a school in Zagreb. He was one of four most important members of the Varaždin literary circle, besides Antun Vramec, Blaž Škrinjarić and Blaž Antilović. Pergošić was tolerant to Protestantism.

Decretum 
Pergošić published his works in Zagreb and Varaždin. In 1574 he printed a translation of “Tripartitum” written by István Werbőczy. Pergošić referred to the language he used in this translation (titled Decretum) was Slavic (Szlouienski in original) and in its preface Pergošić emphasized that it was written for "Slavs and Croats". It is assumed that he used terms Slavs and Croats to refer to the people of two administrative regions of Habsburg monarchy (Kingdom of Slavonia and Kingdom of Croatia) without any sort of ethnic connotation. Pergošić's 1574 translation of “Tripartitum” is considered the first printed book on Kajkavian dialect and the first printed work of Kajkavian literature.

References

Sources 

 
 
 
 
 
 
 

1521 births
1592 deaths
History of the Serbo-Croatian language